Heroes of the Night is a 1927 silent film comedy directed by Frank O'Connor and starring Cullen Landis. It was produced by Gotham Pictures and released by Lumas Film Corporation.

The film is preserved in the Library of Congress collection.

Cast
Cullen Landis as Joe Riley
Marion Nixon as Mary Allen
Rex Lease as Tom Riley
Wheeler Oakman as Jack Nichols
Sarah Padden as Mrs. Riley
J. P. Lockney as Marty Allen
Robert Homans as "Bull" Corrigan
Lois Ingraham as Jennie Lee

References

External links

1927 films
American silent feature films
American black-and-white films
1927 comedy films
Silent American comedy films
Gotham Pictures films
Films directed by Frank O'Connor
1920s American films